Mirogabalin (brand name Tarlige; developmental code name DS-5565) is a medication developed by Daiichi Sankyo, a gabapentinoid. Gabapentin and pregabalin are also members of this class. As a gabapentinoid, mirogabalin binds to the α2δ subunit of voltage-gated calcium channel (1 and 2), but with significantly higher potency than pregabalin. It has shown promising results in Phase II clinical trials for the treatment of diabetic peripheral neuropathic pain.

Phase III trial results:

 Effective: for post-herpetic neuralgia (trial: NEUCOURSE)
 Ineffective: for fibromyalgia (trial: ALDAY)
 Effective: for diabetic peripheral neuropathic pain (trial: REDUCER)

In Japan, the company submitted a marketing application for treatment of peripheral neuropathic pain. The medication was approved for neuropathic pain and postherpetic neuralgia in Japan in January 2019.

References

External links 
 

Amino acids
Analgesics
Calcium channel blockers
Cyclobutanes
Cyclopentenes
Daiichi Sankyo
GABA analogues